Arva Road railway station in County Cavan, Ireland was a former station on the Killashandra branch of the Midland Great Western Railway, Ireland.

The Ordnance Survey of Ireland Discovery Series 1:50,000 map no. 34 shows the station locale.

See also
List of closed railway stations in Ireland

References 

Disused railway stations in County Cavan
Railway stations opened in 1886
Railway stations closed in 1955